The Shanghai–Nanjing Expressway is the main expressway between the Chinese cities of Shanghai and Nanjing. It is also the busiest expressway in China. The expressway began construction on June 14, 1992, was completed in February 1996, and opened to traffic November 28, 1996. That year, it was listed as a key national construction project.

As the first highway in Jiangsu province, the Shanghai–Nanjing Expressway has up-to-date charge, monitoring, communications, lighting, safety and service facilities. It has improved transportation in Jiangsu and Shanghai, and encourages development along its length. It was the first expressway in China to use remote traffic monitoring.

Properties
The expressway is a modern, enclosed, four-lane, two-way highway. There is a  dividing strip in the center of the highway and a  emergency parking area on each side of the highway. It runs from Zhenru, Shanghai to Maqun, Nanjing via Anting, Kunshan, Suzhou, Shuofang, Wuxi, Changzhou, Danyang, Zhenjiang and Jurong. In Shanghai, the highway is coterminous with G2 Beijing–Shanghai Expressway and G42 Shanghai–Chengdu Expressway.

References

Expressways in Jiangsu
Expressways in Shanghai